§

Peebles Rovers Football Club is a Scottish football club based in Peebles, Scottish Borders. Originally founded in 1888 as Greenside Rovers, the club changed their name to Peebles Rovers in the May of 1890. This is at odds with the official date of 1893 which appears to be based upon what was written in a newspaper article in 1947. They play their home matches at Whitestone Park. The club are members of the East of Scotland Football League, in the seventh tier of the Scottish football league system. They were briefly members of the Scottish Football League, between 1923 and 1926.

History
Peebles Rovers were members of the Scottish Football League Third Division between 1923 and 1926, and had only a modest record – finishing 14th and 8th in the two full seasons played, and were 14th in the unfinished 1925–26 season. All told, Peebles Rovers played 86 Scottish Football League matches, winning 28, drawing 15 and losing 43. They scored 159 goals and conceded 190. Their record victory at their Whitestone Park home was 7–1 against Beith on 18 April 1925. Their best away win was 5–2 away against Galston, seven days previously on 11 April 1925. In 1937 Peebles Rovers moved from their traditional home in Victoria Park to Whitestone park, after a local businessman successfully managed to acquire planning rights to the eastern end of Victoria Park, intending substantial development that was subsequently curtailed due to the start of World War II.

Peebles Rovers themselves were active long before the Third Division, being formed in 1888 and have played in the Scottish Cup proper over twenty times. Their first appearance was back in 1907–08, when they lost 4–0 away to Celtic. In their first 11 appearances, they were drawn away from home on each and every occasion, spanning 19 ties in all. They managed to win three of these and draw two, including holding Hibernian to a 0–0 draw at Easter Road in 1923 – easily their best result in the competition. In this season, Paddy McBoyle starred as top scorer with a total of 27 league goals.

Other than a replay win over St Cuthbert's Wanderers, they did not have a home tie until beating Keith 7–3 in 1926. They drew away to Albion Rovers in the next round, before losing the replay. They also drew with their Coatbridge namesakes in 1957, and again lost the replay.

The season before that, they were involved in a marathon tie with Brechin City. There was a 1–1 draw away, 4–4 at home after extra time, 0–0 in a second replay at Easter Road, again after extra time and finally losing 6–2 in a third replay, at Tannadice.

After that they took some serious hammerings, losing 10–0 away to St Mirren in 1959, 6–1 at home against Ayr United the next year, and then a 15–1 slaughter away to Hibernian in 1961. Joe Baker scored nine that day and his brother Gerry grabbed four in the earlier debacle at Love Street. During the 1959–1960 season, there was a record 23–2 defeat at the hands of Partick Thistle.

Their final appearance was better though, in 1965–66, they drew 2–2 at Dumbarton and took the Sons to extra time in the replay before losing 3–2. After the match both sides celebrated the match as an exemplar of what football could be.

Their greatest moment in the Qualifying Cup (South) came in the 1953–54 competition, when they defeated Shawfield Amateurs 6–1, Burntisland Shipyard 7–0, Selkirk 4–2 (all at home) and Coldstream 4–1 after a 1–1 draw away to reach the final. Latterly the club is only an associate member of the Scottish Football Association due to the inadequate facilities at Whitestone Park, thus becoming ineligible to compete in the Scottish Cup.

While Peebles Rovers won many minor and local competitions, the highest level they played at, the Third Division apart, is the East of Scotland League, which they won on six occasions – 1928–29, 1932–33, 1933–34, 1934–35, 1935–36 and 1945–46.

In the 1966–67, Rovers joined the junior grade of football and entered a period of decline, until they rejoined the senior ranks in the East of Scotland League in 1980–81. When that set-up was altered to two divisions in the late-1980s, they found themselves in the second tier, and during this period endured a prolonged period of financial hardship resulting in several members of the squad volunteering in the local town to make ends meet. Although they won promotion several times, their stays in the Premier were of short duration. In the 2007–08 season, Peebles won promotion to the East of Scotland Premier Division, but were relegated back to the First Division in the 2010–11 season.

Largest crowds to watch them have been 14,000 and 10,453, both at Easter Road in the Scottish Cup in 1923 and 1961. The record gate at Whitestone Park is recorded as 1,750 for the 4–2 first round Scottish Cup win over Gala Fairydean in 1961.

Michael Wilson was named the club's new manager in April 2020. Wilson was joined in December 2020 by Colin Macdonald, a local businessman who accepted the role of Club Chairman.  Following a poor start to the 2022/23 season, Wilson joined Vale of Leithen, leaving the way clear for Ger Rossi to return as manager for a second spell after a successful period with the club a few years earlier.

Honours
East of Scotland Football League
 Winners: 1928–29, 1932–33, 1933–34, 1934–35, 1935–36, 1945–46
 Runners-up: 1938–39, 1948–49, 1952–53, 1954–55, 1956–57, 1963–64
East of Scotland Football League First Division
 Winners: 1988–89, 1997–98, 2014–15
 Runners-up: 2001–02, 2007–08
King Cup
 Winners: 1907–08, 1952–53, 1953–54, 1961–62, 1962–63, 2014–15
Alex Jack Cup
Winners: 1999–00
Runners-up: 2014–15, 2007–08

Coronation Cup 

The Coronation Cup was an annual five-a-side tournament ran under the auspices of the football club, Peebles Cricket Club and the March Riding Committee.

The trophy was presented to the football club by Mr M.G. Thorburn of Glenormiston for the first competition in 1911.

 Notes

See also
:Category:Peebles Rovers F.C. players

References

External links
Peebles Rovers official website
Peebles Football Club - Youths and Juniors

 
Football clubs in Scotland
Association football clubs established in 1893
Scottish Football League teams
1893 establishments in Scotland
East of Scotland Football League teams
Scottish Junior Football Association clubs
Football clubs in the Scottish Borders